{{Speciesbox
|taxon =Asperdaphne plutonis
|image = 
|image_caption = 
|authority = Thiele, 1925
| synonyms_ref = 
| synonyms = Daphnella (Asperdaphne) plutonis Thiele, 1925
|display_parents = 3
}}Asperdaphne plutonis''' is a species of sea snail, a marine gastropod mollusk in the family Raphitomidae. 

Distribution
This marine species occurs off East Africa.

References

 J. Thiele, 1925. Gastropoden der Deutschen Tiefsee-Expedition''. In:. Wissenschaftliche Ergebnisse der Deutschen Tiefsee-Expedition II. Teil, vol. 17, No. 2, Gutstav Fischer, Berlin.

External links
 

plutonis
Gastropods described in 1925